The Bodega of Los Cuerros is a 1919 German silent film directed by Erik Lund.

Cast
In alphabetical order

References

Bibliography

External links

1919 films
Films of the Weimar Republic
German silent feature films
Films directed by Erik Lund
German black-and-white films
1910s German films